Hutal Batkul is a town, and one of twenty union councils in Battagram District in the Khyber Pakhtunkhwa province of Pakistan. The village is composed of eight small towns.  The entire population of the village belongs to the same tribe and are Akhund Khails the sons of Akhund Drveza Baba. His original name was Abull Rashed Sahaib, an accomplished scholar of formal outward religion, a mystic‚ and an accomplished poet in Pashto and Persian. Here is BHO High School and مدرسہ تعلیم القرآن. The source of most income of the people is from overseas.

References

Union councils of Battagram District
Populated places in Battagram District